Edward Flint may refer to:

 Edward S. Flint (1819–1902), mayor of Cleveland, Ohio from 1861 to 1862

See also 
 Flint (disambiguation)